Pakistani vegetable dishes are vegetable dishes of Pakistan.

Vegetable dishes
The following is a list of most popular vegetable dishes in Pakistan.

See also

List of eggplant dishes
 List of vegetable dishes

References

External links

 
 Pakistani Food

 
Pakistani cuisine